Enes Kubat (born 1 March 1994) is a Turkish professional footballer who plays for TFF Third League club Hacettepe 1945 SK. He made his Süper Lig debut on 12 February 2012.

References

External links
 
 

1994 births
People from Altındağ, Ankara
Footballers from Ankara
Living people
Turkish footballers
Association football forwards
MKE Ankaragücü footballers
Göztepe S.K. footballers
Kartalspor footballers
Altınordu F.K. players
Süper Lig players
TFF First League players
TFF Second League players
TFF Third League players